Events in the year 1850 in Portugal.

Incumbents
Monarch: Mary II
Prime Minister: da Costa Cabral

Events
18 October – the title Duke of Palmela established, first granted to Dom Pedro de Sousa Holstein

Births

12 June – Roberto Ivens, explorer of Africa, geographer, colonial administrator, and naval officer (died 1898).

Deaths

12 October – Pedro de Sousa Holstein, 1st Duke of Palmela, diplomat and statesman (b. 1781)

References

 
1850s in Portugal
Portugal
Years of the 19th century in Portugal
Portugal